Diane Kruger ( Heidkrüger; ; born 15 July 1976) is a German and American actress. Early in her career, Kruger gained worldwide recognition and received the Trophée Chopard from the Cannes Film Festival. 

Kruger became known for her roles in film as Helen in the epic war film Troy (2004), Dr. Abigail Chase in the heist film National Treasure (2004) and its 2007 sequel, Bridget von Hammersmark in Quentin Tarantino's war film Inglourious Basterds (2009), and Gina in the psychological thriller film Unknown (2011). She also starred as Detective Sonya Cross in the FX crime drama series The Bridge (2013–14). In 2017, she made her German-language debut in Fatih Akin's In the Fade, for which she won the Cannes Film Festival Award for Best Actress.

In 2014, she was made an Officer of the Ordre des Arts et des Lettres.

Early life
Diane Heidkrüger was born on 15 July 1976.  She was brought up Catholic and attended Catholic school. She has stated that one of her grandmothers was Polish.

She was brought up in West Germany with her younger brother, Stefan. Her mother sent her to student exchange programs when she was a teenager to improve her English. As a child, Kruger wanted to become a ballerina and successfully auditioned for the Royal Ballet School in London, but a knee injury cut her ballet career short. Later, Kruger moved to Paris working as a model and began learning French.

Career

Modeling 
In 1993, Kruger represented Germany in the Elite Model Look and started modelling afterwards. Despite her relatively short stature for a model, she managed to land bookings such as advertisements from Yves Saint Laurent, Chanel, Salvatore Ferragamo, Giorgio Armani, Jil Sander, Christian Dior, Burberry and Louis Vuitton; runway shows from Marc Jacobs, D&G and Sonia Rykiel as well as appearances on the cover of Vogue Paris, Marie Claire and Cosmopolitan to her modeling repertoire. She gradually stopped modelling after deciding to pursue a career in acting.

Acting 

Kruger became interested in acting and took lessons at the Cours Florent. She made her film debut in 2002, opposite Dennis Hopper and Christopher Lambert in The Piano Player, a TV film by Jean-Pierre Roux. The same year, she also starred in her then husband's directorial début Mon Idole.

She played Julie Wood in 2003's Michel Vaillant and Lisa in Wicker Park (2004), alongside Josh Hartnett and Rose Byrne. One of her more high-profile roles to date is her portrayal of Helen of Sparta in Wolfgang Petersen's epic Troy. In 2004, Kruger starred with Nicolas Cage and Sean Bean (who co-starred with her in Troy) in the film National Treasure, going on to appear in films Joyeux Noël (2005), and Copying Beethoven (2006). She reprised her role as Dr. Abigail Chase in National Treasure: Book of Secrets, released in December 2007.

Kruger was the hostess of the opening and closing ceremonies of the 2007 Cannes Film Festival. Kruger was a jury member of the 58th Berlin International Film Festival in 2008. The festival is chaired by Costa Gavras.

In 2009, she co-starred as a German actress turned Allied spy in Quentin Tarantino's film Inglourious Basterds. In December 2009, she announced the nominations of the 67th Golden Globe Awards and also picked up nominations from the Screen Actors' Guild for Best Supporting Actress and Outstanding Performance by a Cast of a Motion Picture for her role in Inglourious Basterds.

Kruger played Anna in Jaco Van Dormael's Mr. Nobody. Critical response has praised the film's artistry and Kruger's acting. Kruger made a cameo appearance in an April 2010 episode of the Fox show Fringe, in which her former boyfriend, actor Joshua Jackson, starred. In 2010, Kruger also appeared in Mark Ronson's music video for "Somebody to Love Me", where she plays Boy George.

In the 2011 film Unknown, Kruger starred as Gina, a Bosnian undocumented immigrant, and key character alongside leading actor Liam Neeson. It was also announced in 2011 that Kruger had replaced Eva Green in the role of Marie Antoinette in the French-language film, Les Adieux à la Reine. In 2012, she was named as a member of the Jury for the Main Competition at the 2012 Cannes Film Festival. The festival is chaired by Nanni Moretti. She starred in the film adaptation of Stephenie Meyer's novel The Host, which was released in March 2013. More recently, Kruger portrayed El Paso, Texas, police officer Sonya Cross on FX's The Bridge, which aired in 2013. In 2015, she was named as a member of the Jury for the Main Competition at the 2015 Venice Film Festival. In 2016, she co-starred in The Infiltrator with Bryan Cranston and John Leguizamo. 

In 2017, Kruger made a rare film appearance in Germany in the thriller In the Fade by Fatih Akin, she won several awards for her performance. In 2019, Kruger replaced Marion Cotillard in the spy movie The 355, playing a BND agent.

In 2022, Kruger starred in the thriller “Out of the Blue”, opposite Ray Nicholson, son of Jack.

Public image

Kruger was included in People "50 Most Beautiful People in the World" 2004 issue. She appeared on Maxim "Hot 100" list twice, ranking at No. 50 in 2005 and No. 88 in 2009. She also ranked at No. 83 on AskMen "Top 99 Women" list in 2010.

Kruger is a brand ambassador for Swiss watch manufacturer Jaeger-LeCoultre. In December 2009, she was announced as the global "spokesmodel" of L'Oréal. It was announced in May 2010 that she would become the latest face for Calvin Klein's newest fragrance line, Beauty.

Personal life
Kruger is fluent in German, English and French. Additionally, she studied Latin in school for eight years, though she does not speak it. In 2013, she became an American citizen. Kruger has stated that she has a fear of horses and will not take part in any films that require her to ride or interact with horses, revealing that she has given up roles in the past because of this. Her fear stems from having been previously thrown off the animals by accident.

In 1999, she began dating French actor and director Guillaume Canet. They were married on 1 September 2001. They acted together in Joyeux Noël (2005) and divorced in 2006. Kruger said that the marriage was unsuccessful because their careers had kept them in different parts of the world. 

From 2006 to 2016, she was in a relationship with actor Joshua Jackson.

In 2015, Kruger met actor Norman Reedus on the set of Sky. The two were first seen together as a couple in July 2016. In November 2018, Kruger gave birth to their daughter, her first and his second child.

Filmography

Film

Television

Awards and nominations

Honors
  Officer of the Ordre des Arts et des Lettres (22 September 2014).

Notes

References

External links

 
 
 
 Diane Kruger at AskMen

1976 births
21st-century American actresses
21st-century German actresses
Cours Florent alumni
American expatriates in Canada
American expatriates in France
American female models
American film actresses
American people of German descent
American people of Polish descent
American television actresses
Former Roman Catholics
German expatriates in Canada
German expatriates in France
German expatriates in the United States
German female models
German film actresses
German people of Polish descent
German television actresses
Living people
Cannes Film Festival Award for Best Actress winners
Officiers of the Ordre des Arts et des Lettres
Outstanding Performance by a Cast in a Motion Picture Screen Actors Guild Award winners
People educated at the Royal Ballet School
People from Hildesheim (district)
People with acquired American citizenship
Chopard Trophy for Female Revelation winners